Islam and Dhimmitude: Where Civilizations Collide is a book by  Bat Ye'or.

Reception
Norman A. Stillman, Professor of Judaic History at the University of Oklahoma, in his review for Israel Studies Forum, says 
"For Bat Ye'or dhimmitude is itself a civilisation, which she defines as "a comprehensive system of laws, traditions and culture evolving in duration according to specific and structural parameters, which maintain its homogeneity, its behavioural patterns and their transmission." Dhimmitude she argues is not only a civilisation, but it is the mindset and behaviour patterns of the non-Muslim people's themselves. ... As with her previous books, this one marshals a great deal of evidence, and has some very valid points to make, but again, as with her former efforts, the material is so one-sidedly selective, so oversimplified, and her rhetoric so hyperbolic and bathetic that whatever merits there are in her arguments are thoroughly overshadowed by the tendentiousness of the polemics."

Notes

Further reading

External links
Dhimmitude website maintained by Bat Ye'or

2001 non-fiction books
Books critical of Islam
Islam and other religions
Eurabia